Following is a list of riots and protests in Sri Lanka, an island nation situated in South Asia. Throughout its history, Sri Lanka has experienced a number of riots. Since 1915, many of them have stemmed from ethnic tensions between the Sinhalese majority and minority Tamil and Moor populations.

19th century

1850–1900
 1883 − 1883 Kotahena riots, Kotahena, Western Province: Riots began once Buddhists who were proceeding in procession to Deepaduttarama Viharaya at Kotahena were attacked by a group of Roman Catholics.

20th century

1900–1950
 1915 − 1915 Ceylonese riots, Kandy, Central Province: Riots between Sinhalese and Sri Lankan Moors erupted after a group of Moors attacked a Buddhist pageant with stones. Riots soon spread across the entire island.

1950s
 1953 − 1953 Ceylonese Hartal, Western, Southern and Sabaragamuwa Provinces: a nationwide demonstration, a hartal which eventually led to civil unrest. It was one of the riots which did not involve ethnicity and was conducted by leftist groups.
 1956 − 1956 anti-Tamil pogrom, Eastern Province: Sinhalese-Tamil riots in Ceylon. The majority of victims were Sri Lankan Tamils in Gal Oya, a new settlement in the Eastern Province. The total number of deaths was reportedly 150.
 1958 − 1958 anti-Tamil pogrom: Also known as the '58 riots. They were a watershed event for the race relationships between various ethnic communities of Sri Lanka. The total number of deaths was estimated to be 300, mostly Sri Lankan Tamils.

1960s
 1966 − Demonstrations in Colombo organized by the SLFP, left-wing parties, and trade unions in protest of the Tamil Regulations Act turned into riots, forcing the Government of Ceylon to declare a state of emergency.
 1969 − Ceylon Communist Party (Maoist) conducted a mass rally in 1969 which ended in bloodshed, the major cause for the riot being the banning of the May Day rally.

1970s
 1971 − Ceylonese protests against the Vietnam War: began at the height of the Cold War, with few clashes between various leftist groups and the Sri Lankan police.
 1977 − 1977 Anti-Tamil pogromL began on 12 August 1977, less than a month after the United National Party came to power. Over 300 Tamils were killed during the riots.

1980s
 1981 − Burning of the Jaffna Library, Jaffna, Northern Province: The Jaffna Public Library was burnt by a mob of Sinhalese individuals, resulting in the loss of over 100,000 books, artifacts and palm writings. Four Sri Lankan Tamils were killed.
 1981 − Anti-Tamil pogroms were carried out by Sinhalese mobs predominantly against Indian Tamils in Ratnapura, Kahawatte and Balangoda. Shops were looted and set on fire and many women and girls were raped by marauding mobs.
 1983 − Black July Anti-Tamil pogrom: pogrom committed against Tamils of Sri Lanka where between 400 and 3,000 Tamil civilians were killed and many more made homeless and refugees. This was believed to be the main cause of the Sri Lankan Civil War.
1987 − 1987 Trincomalee riots, Trincomalee, Eastern Province: riots against the Sinhalese carried about by Tamil mobs, backed by militant leaders in Trincomalee that later morphed into LTTE violence against the Sinhalese. Over 200 Sinhalese were killed and thousands were rendered homeless or displaced.

1990s
 1997 − Kalutara prison riots, Kalutara, Western Province: Three Tamil detainees were killed at the Kalutara high security detention center on 12 December 1997.
 On 8 September 1998, a riot was unleashed on Plantation Tamils in Ratnapura where 200 organised Sinhalese goons with the support of local Sinhala politicians burnt down 800 houses. Several rapes of Tamil women in the area by Sinhalese thugs was also reported. The riot was sparked by the murder of two Sinhala youths, one of them in Bandusena, who had a reputation for raping women and being involved in illegal liquor sales. The Sinhala attackers were given full impunity by the local police and no one was held accountable for their crimes.

21st century

2000s
 2001 − Mawanella riots, Mawanella, Central Province: Clashes that resulted in the deaths of 2 people, and left more than 15 injured and property destroyed.
 2002 − Beruwala riots, Beruwala, Western Province: Sectarian clashes sparked between the Wahabbi and the Sunni sects of the Muslim community in Beruwala which left at least 3 dead and over 16 injured after police intervention in the conflict.

2010s
 2012  − 2012 Welikada prison riot, Welikada, Western Province: A riot in the Welikada Prison in November 2012 resulted in death of 27 prisoners and 43 injuries.
 2014  − 2014 anti-Muslim riots, Kalutara, Western Province: Clashes between Sinhalese and Muslims resulting in four dead and 80 injured.
 2018 − 2018 anti-Muslim riots: Clashes between Sinhalese and Muslims, involving Sinhalese attacks on Muslims and mosques.
 2019 − 2019 anti-Muslim riots: A series of attacks on Muslims, Muslim-owned property and businesses and mosques in retaliation to the 2019 Easter bombings.

2020s 

 2020 − Mahara prison riot, Mahara, Western Province: A riot erupted in the Mahara Prison following rumors that prisoners infected with COVID-19 from other prisons would be transferred to Mahara Prison. The riot resulted in 11 inmates dead and 117 inmates severely injured.
 2022 − 2022 Sri Lankan protests: All across the island, several protests erupted against the incumbent government of president Gotabaya Rajapaksa due to poor management of the ongoing economic crisis, severe inflation and shortages of fuel and other essential items.

See also
 Sri Lankan Civil War
 Human rights in Sri Lanka

References

Further reading

External links
Timeline of ethnic conflict
BBC timeline of Sri Lankan conflict

Sri Lanka
Sri Lanka

Sri Lanka and state terrorism
Origins of the Sri Lankan Civil War
Sri Lanka
Riots